Jaime Andrés Marulanda (born 1978) is a confessed Colombian hitman who claimed to have committed 137 murders. The authorities confirmed 37 of those killings, many of which were committed between April and November 2002.

According to his own confession, Marulanda worked as a patrolman for the AUC, who ordered most of the murders. Many of his victims were social leaders, but also included minors.

Nicknamed El Chiquilín due to his short stature (1,50 centimeters), Marulanda is currently being held in an Acacías prison. He was sentenced to 28 years imprisonment.

Crimes 
Marulanda is believed to have carried out most of the murders between April and November 2002, in an area called Cazucá and Bosa, between Bogotá and Soacha. He worked for the AUC, a group that ordered several targeted assassinations. According to the files of the Colombian authorities, he earned approximately $400,000 pesos for each murder.

Of the 137 murders he confessed to having committed, he is associated with two in particular: being responsible for or at least complicit in the deaths of Luis Alfredo Colmenares Chía, former governor and representative to the House of Arauca Department, and former congressman Octavio Sarmiento.

Among some of the Marulanda's victims included in the list are the following:

Capture and imprisonment 
Marulanda was captured by Colombian authorities in 2003, after he was conclusively connected to the 37 murders. On the day of his trial, he admitted to killing a total of 137 people.

Due to the crimes for which he was responsible, Marulada was imposed a 28-year sentence. He is serving said sentence at a prison in Acacías.

References 

1978 births
21st-century criminals
Colombian murderers of children
Colombian people convicted of murder
Living people
People convicted of murder by Colombia